Nina Kraus is a professor at Northwestern University, investigating the neural encoding of speech and music and its plasticity where she is the Hugh S. Knowles Chair.

Her Auditory Neuroscience Lab, also known as Brainvolts, examines the biological processing of sound throughout the life span, how it is disrupted in clinical populations (language disorders; concussion), and how it reacts to differing levels of expertise (music; bilingualism). Her work has shown that the hearing brain is vast—engaging our cognitive, sensory, motor, and reward networks. This perspective is illustrated in her book Of Sound Mind: How Our Brain Constructs a Meaningful Sonic World. Investigations are aimed at improving human communication. Kraus’ work is rooted in a desire to bring scientific understanding into educational and clinical settings.

Book 

 Kraus, N. (2021). Of Sound Mind: How Our Brain Constructs a Meaningful Sonic World. MIT Press.

References

External links
Brainvolts Lab website

American music psychologists
Northwestern University faculty
American neuroscientists
American women neuroscientists
Living people
Year of birth missing (living people)
American women academics
21st-century American women